Xindian may refer to:

Xindian District (新店區), New Taipei, Republic of China (Taiwan)
Xindian River, a river in northern Taiwan

Mainland China 
Xindian culture, Bronze Age culture in Gansu and Qinghai

Towns

Written as 辛店镇
Xindian, Mengcun County, Hebei
Xindian, Ren County, Hebei
Xindian, Dezhou, in Yucheng, Shandong

Written as 新店镇
Xindian, Xiamen, in Xiang'an District, Xiamen, Fujian

See also
Xindi (Star Trek), a collective term for six fictional races in the television series Star Trek: Enterprise